Alice (Adeliza, Adelaide) (c. 1002 – 1038) was a daughter of Richard II, Duke of Normandy (972–1026) and Judith of Brittany.

She married Reginald I, Count of Burgundy and had the following children:
William I, Count of Burgundy 
Guy (c. 1025–1069) 
Hugh  (c. 1037 – c. 1086), Viscount of Lons-le-Saunier, sire Montmorot, Navilly and Scey married to Aldeberge Scey. They had a son Montmorot Thibert, founder of the house Montmorot (or Montmoret).
Falcon or Fouques of Burgundy

Notes

References

Countesses of Burgundy
1000s births
1038 deaths
11th-century French people
11th-century French women

Year of birth uncertain